The European Amateur Boxing Championships is the highest competition for boxing amateurs in Europe, organised by the continent's governing body EUBC, which stands for the European Boxing Confederation. The first edition of the tournament took place in 1924, although the first 'competitive' championships were hosted by the city of Stockholm (Sweden) in 1925.

EUBC events
In 2008 AIBA changed names of age groups (Junior->Youth, Cadet->Junior).

Sources:

Editions

Men

 Notes
 After World War II, the results were annulled by AIBA (1942).
 Held as part of the 2019 European Games.

Women

Medals
Two bronze medals awarded from 1951 European Amateur Boxing Championships. Two bronze medals not awarded in 2001 Women's European Amateur Boxing Championships because of lake of competitors.

Men (1925–2022)
As of 2022 European Amateur Boxing Championships (Exclude 1942).

Women (2001–2022)
As of 2022 Women's European Amateur Boxing Championships.

Combined (Men and Women) (1925–2022)
As of 2022 Women's European Amateur Boxing Championships (Exclude 1942).

Multiple gold medalists
Boldface denotes active amateur boxers and highest medal count among all boxers (including these who not included in these tables) per type.

Men

Women

European U22 Boxing Championships
Source:

European Youth Boxing Championships (U19)
Source:

 1970–1982 : U20
 1984–Now: U19
 In 2008 AIBA changed names of age groups (Junior->Youth, Cadet->Junior).

Men

Women

Combined (Men and Women)

European Junior Boxing Championships (U17)
Source:

 In 2008 AIBA changed names of age groups (Junior->Youth, Cadet->Junior).

Men

Women

Combined (Men and Women)

European School Boxing Championships (U15)
Source:

European Military Boxing Championships

European Stuents Boxing Championships

EUBC European Boxing Cup

Men
1.EUBC European Cup – Kharkov, Ukraine – October 22–23, 2010

Women
1.European Cup – Koeping, Sweden – June 8–12, 1999

2.European Cup – Macon, France – April 6–9, 2000

Balkan Boxing Championships

1.Balkan Championships – Bucharest, Romania – May 19–25, 1947

2.Balkan Championships – Istanbul, Turkey – April 15–17, 1960

3.Balkan Championships – Bucharest, Romania – Juy 11–15 1961

4.Balkan Championships – Sofia, Bulgaria – May 23–25, 1962

5.Balkan Championships – Belgrade, Yugoslavia – May 27–29, 1966

6.Balkan Championships – Istanbul, Turkey – April 19–22, 1967

7.Balkan Championships – Galati, Romania – September 11–14, 1969

8.Balkan Championships – Varna, Bulgaria – May 20–23, 1970

9.Balkan Championships – Titograd, Yugoslavia – April 28 – May 2, 1971

10.Balkan Championships – Ankara, Turkey – May 16–20, 1972

11.Balkan Championships – Athens, Greece – May 3–7, 1973

12.Balkan Championships – Constanta, Romania – June 25–29, 1974

13.Balkan Championships – Sofia, Bulgaria – July 23–27, 1975

14.Balkan Championships – Zagreb, Yugoslavia – June 3–6, 1976

15.Balkan Championships – Bursa, Turkey – September 22–25, 1977

16.Balkan Championships – Athens, Greece – October 1–4, 1978

17.Balkan Championships – Tulcea, Romania – July 3–7, 1979

18.Balkan Championships – Pernik, Bulgaria – October 29 – November 1, 1980

19.Balkan Championships – Pula, Yugoslavia – October 1–4, 1981

20.Balkan Championships – Bursa, Turkey – October 27–31, 1982

21.Balkan Championships – Athens, Greece – November 27–30, 1983

22.Balkan Championships – Braila, Romania – September 1984

23.Balkan Championships – Sofia, Bulgaria – September 21–23, 1985

Balkan Championships – Pristina, Yugoslavia – June 25–28, 1987

Balkan Championships – Patras, Greece – November 20–25, 1990

Balkan Championships – Antalya, Turkey – December 11–14, 2019

Balkan Championships – Zagreb, Croatia – May 6–9, 2021

1.Balkan U-20 Championships – Bursa, Turkey – September 18–21, 1975

2.Balkan U-20 Championships – Braila, Romania – August 25–28, 1976

3.Balkan U-20 Championships – Athens, Greece – July 19–24, 1977

4.Balkan U-20 Championships – Slavonski Brod, Yugoslavia – April 14–16, 1978

5.Balkan U-20 Championships – Gabrovo, Bulgaria – June 5–6, 1979

6.Balkan U-20 Championships – Izmir, Turkey – December 3–7, 1980

7.Balkan U-20 Championships – Galati, Romania – December 15–19, 1981

8.Balkan U-20 Championships – Thessaloniki, Greece – October 7–10, 1982

10.Balkan U-20 Championships – Adapazan, Turkey – December 5–8, 1985

Balkan U-20 Championships – Patras, Greece – November 1987

1.Balkan Olympic Days – Sofia, Bulgaria – 1997

2.Balkan Olympic Days – Ohrid, Macedonia – June 28–29, 2002

Nordic Boxing Championships

1.Nordic Championships – Copenhagen, Denmark – February 11–13, 1955

2.Nordic Championships – Helsinki, Finland – April 28–29, 1957

3.Nordic Championships – Stockholm, Sweden – April 16–17, 1959

4.Nordic Championships – Oslo, Norway – April 13–14, 1961

5.Nordic Championships – Helsinki, Finland – April 4–5, 1963

6.Nordic Championships – Copenhagen, Denmark – April 1–2, 1965

7.Nordic Championships – Stockholm, Sweden – April 3–4, 1967

8.Nordic Championships – Oslo, Norway – March 23–24, 1969

9.Nordic Championships – Helsinki, Finland – April 2–3, 1970

10.Nordic Championships – Copenhagen, Denmark – April 7–8, 1972

11.Nordic Championships – Stockholm, Sweden – July 1974

12.Nordic Championships – Stockholm, Sweden – April 1976

Nordic Junior Championships – Oslo, Norway – March 31 – April 1, 1979

14.Nordic Championships – Copenhagen, Denmark – March 29–30, 1980

15.Nordic Championships – Stockholm, Sweden – March 1982

16.Nordic Championships – Bergen, Norway – April 7–8, 1984

17.Nordic Championships – Helsinki, Finland – July 1986

18.Nordic Championships – Roskilde, Denmark – March 26–27, 1988

19.Nordic Championships – Helsingborg, Sweden – March 24–25, 1990

Nordic Junior Championships – Ringsted, Denmark – March 23–24, 1991

20.Nordic Championships – Oslo, Norway – April 3–4, 1992

Nordic Junior Championships – Norway – March 1998

Nordic Junior & Women Championships – Uppsala, Sweden – March 25–26, 2000

Nordic Junior & Women Championships – Give, Denmark – March 31 – April 1, 2001

Nordic Junior & Women Championships – Moss, Norway – March 23–24, 2002

Nordic Junior & Women Championships – Lahti, Finland – March 22–23, 2003

Nordic Junior & Women Championships – Stockholm, Sweden – March 27–28, 2004

Nordic Junior & Women Championships – Tonsberg, Norway – March 25–26, 2006

Nordic Junior & Women Championships – Loviisa, Finland – March 24–25, 2007

Nordic Junior & Women Championships – Lund, Sweden – March 29–30, 2008

Nordic Championships – Aabybro, Denmark – April 4–5, 2009

Nordic Championships – Oslo, Norway – March 20–21, 2010

Nordic Championships – Lahti, Finland – March 26–27, 2011

Nordic Championships – Stockholm, Sweden – March 24–25, 2012

Nordic Championships – Aarhus, Denmark – March 23–24, 2013

Nordic Championships – Tampere, Finland – March 28–29, 2015

Nordic Championships – Gothenburg, Sweden – March 26–27, 2016

Nordic Championships – Gilleleje, Denmark – April 1–2, 2017

Nordic Championships – Oslo, Norway – March 24–25, 2018

Nordic Championships – Tampere, Finland – March 30–31, 2019

Nordic Championships – Reykjanesbaer, Iceland – March 25–27, 2022

See also
 World Amateur Boxing Championships
 AIBA Youth World Boxing Championships
 European Union Amateur Boxing Championships
 Boxing at the 2015 European Games
 Boxing at the 2019 European Games

References

External links
 European Boxing Confederation

Results database
 http://amateur-boxing.strefa.pl/Championships/AAAChampionships.html
 http://amateur-boxing.strefa.pl/Championships/EuropeanChampionships.html
 http://amateur-boxing.strefa.pl/Championships/European_wom_Champs.html

 
Boxing competitions
Amateur boxing
Boxing competitions in Europe
boxing
Recurring sporting events established in 1925